George Hemphill is an American art dealer. He is a member of the board of directors of the Association of International Photography Art Dealers. He was curator of photography for the Middendorf Gallery in Washington, D.C. He has edited and published several publications on art and photography, including Man Ray's Paris Portraits: 1921-39, William Christenberry: W/P, and Joseph Mills: Inner City.

Works

Bibliography
Hemphill, George, Ben Davis, Sarah Schroth (1977), BEO, Atlanta, Nexus Press-Book of mail art

References

External links
 https://www.washingtonpost.com/wp-dyn/content/article/2005/10/25/AR2005102500780_pf.html
 https://www.washingtonpost.com/wp-dyn/content/article/2008/11/13/AR2008111300934.html
 http://www.aaa.si.edu/collections/oralhistories/oralhistory/franke93.htm

Living people
American art dealers
American art curators
Year of birth missing (living people)